is a popular Japanese political term for the 83 LDP members of the House of Representatives first elected in the 2005 general election. The Koizumi Children are loosely organized into a political association called .

The term is a reference to then-prime minister Junichiro Koizumi, with whom the LDP success in the 2005 elections is closely associated. Some of the children were so-called 'assassins,' candidates hand-picked by Koizumi to defeat LDP party members who opposed his efforts at postal reform. As such, the children are popularly associated with Koizumi's reform-minded policies. Koichi Yamauchi, one of the children, has described the term as "essentially meaningless," arguing that differences among the group such as faction membership and personal background make any description of the children as a group problematic.

In the following 2009 general election, only 10 of the 83 Koizumi Children were re-elected. The 2009 election saw a massive defeat for the ruling LDP and brought the opposition DPJ to power for the first time. Ironically, most of these Koizumi Children were defeated in their districts by candidates who were "parachuted" in by the DPJ and others in a style much like the LDP once adopted. The election also saw a number of young DPJ politicians, all handpicked by DPJ election strategist Ichirō Ozawa, sent to "assassinate" vulnerable LDP seats and subsequently elected in the same manner as the Koizumi Children. As such, these DPJ Diet members were dubbed the "Ozawa Children".

Many of the Koizumi Children defeated in 2009 returned to the House of Representatives in the 2012 general election, and some were later elected to the House of Councillors.

Koizumi Children and their fates

Held their seat in 2009 
 Toshiko Abe – held seat through 2014 election
 Ryosei Akazawa – held seat through 2014 election
 Tomomi Inada – held seat through 2014 election; served as Minister of Defense in the Abe cabinet
 Shigeo Kitamura – held seat through 2014 election
 Keiko Nagaoka – held seat through 2014 election
 Yasuhiro Ozato – held seat through 2014 election
 Masaaki Taira – held seat through 2014 election
 Takeshi Tokuda – held seat through 2012 election; resigned from the Diet in 2014

Defeated in 2009 and returned in 2012 
 Jiro Akama 
 Tōru Doi 
 Mineyuki Fukuda 
 Kenji Harada 
 Hirotaka Ishihara 
 Tadahiko Ito 
 Hideki Makihara 
 Yoshitami Kameoka 
 Kotaro Nagasaki 
 Kazuyuki Nakane 
 Takashi Ōtsuka 
 Taku Otsuka 
 Manabu Sakai 
 Ryosei Tanaka 
 Naomi Tokashiki 
 Kenichiro Ueno
 Tomohiro Yamamoto

Defeated in 2009 and otherwise returned to the Diet 
 Masaaki Akaike – elected to House of Councillors in 2013
 Takamaro Fukuoka – elected to House of Councillors in 2010
 Kuniko Inoguchi – served in the Koizumi cabinet; elected to House of Councillors in 2010
 Satsuki Katayama – elected to House of Councillors in 2010
 Yukari Sato – elected to House of Councillors in 2010; returned to House of Representatives in 2014
 Koichiro Shimizu – returned in 2013-14 as replacement for Hideo Higashikokubaru, defeated in 2014

Defeated in 2009 and did not return to the Diet 
 Etsuji Arai – left politics
 Osamu Ashitomi – left politics
 Nobuhiko Endō –  left LDP to run for third parties
 Makiko Fujino – left politics
 Yukari Iijima – left politics
 Nobuko Iwaki – defeated in 2009 and 2012; left politics
 Kyoko Izawa – left politics
 Nobuhiro Omiya – defeated in 2009, 2012 and 2014
 Taizō Sugimura – became television personality
 Toshio Ukishima – left politics

References 

 
Political terminology in Japan